The Palace Gates Line was a short railway branch line in north London running from the main line at Seven Sisters station in Tottenham to Palace Gates (Wood Green) station in Wood Green.

Opening
The line was constructed by the Great Eastern Railway (GER) and opened on 1 January 1878 with a temporary terminus at Noel Park and Wood Green station before being opened to Palace Gates (Wood Green) station on 7 October 1878. The line was opened in competition with the Great Northern Railway (GNR) line from King's Cross station to provide passenger services from the GER's London terminus at Liverpool Street station to the recently opened Alexandra Palace and the developing suburb of Wood Green.

Extension to Bowes Park
After the 1921 Railways Act amalgamated the GER, GNR and other railway companies into the London and North Eastern Railway (LNER) in 1923, a connection to Bowes Park on the GNR Hertford Loop Line, which runs just north of the site of the terminus station, was made in 1929.

Decline
With the nearby GNR built stations at Alexandra Palace and Hornsey providing a more direct route to central London, the catchment areas for the line's stations were always fairly small and the opening in 1932 of the first section of the Piccadilly line extension to Cockfosters with stations at Wood Green and Turnpike Lane diminished them further, crucially eroding the line's passenger traffic.

In the early 1950s, the line was one of only two branches in the London area still worked by elderly F5, mainly, and F6 2-4-2Ts.  The remaining examples of these were called into Stratford Works for withdrawal, in mid-1958.  There then being no other suitable locomotives for the Palace Gates line, many of its trains were worked by J68 and J69 0-6-0Ts until sufficient N7 0-6-2Ts became available, following the electrification of suburban services from Liverpool Street station to Chingford and Hertford, in November, 1960.  N7 and L1 steam locomotives continued to be used, until September, 1962.

In later years, services ran to North Woolwich rather than Liverpool Street, mainly to the benefit of workers in the docks living in the areas served by the line.

Closure
The Palace Gates line was closed to passengers on 7 January 1963. Goods services continued to run until 5 October 1964.

The site today
Tracks were removed and the stations demolished and the route of the line has been almost entirely covered by new construction including The Mall Wood Green (Shopping City). The only part of the line that remains is a short section of track within Bounds Green Depot where the line formerly connected to the Hertford Loop Line. A small section of the route can be seen from Avenue Road.

The latest (2015) proposed route for Crossrail 2, sees an option that would closely resemble the Palace Gates Line, running from Seven Sisters/South Tottenham railway station (double-ended station) through either Turnpike Lane and Alexandra Palace stations, or Wood Green Underground station, on its way to New Southgate railway station.

References

External links
 Abandoned Tube Stations - Palace Gates Line
 Subterranea Britannica - Seven Sisters Station - contains a history of the Palace Gates Branch
 The History Files: Railway Walks - Seven Sisters to Palace Gates

Transport in the London Borough of Haringey
Railway lines opened in 1878
Closed railway lines in London
Railway lines closed in 1964
Standard gauge railways in London